Krągłe ['krɔŋwe] may refer to:

Places 
Krągłe, Podlaskie Voivodeship, in north-east Poland
Krągłe, West Pomeranian Voivodeship, in north-west Poland

See also 
"The Kragle", a super-weapon in The Lego Movie